Palisades is an unincorporated community in Downers Grove Township, DuPage County, Illinois, United States. Palisades is located along the north bank of the Des Plaines River and the Chicago Sanitary and Ship Canal. It is slightly upriver from the larger city of Lemont. Palisades is just east of Waterfall Glen near the Cook County line. It contains a business park on Jeans Road, which includes the Dupage County Knollwood Plant, a water treatment facility, various truck repair facilities, and other businesses. Palisades also contains various houses on the southern end of Madison Street, 97th Street, and Secret Forest Drive. The area is commonly referred to as "The Darien Palisades", given it's close proximity to the City of Darien. It is named for Centennial Ridge, a rocky hill between the canal and the river, which reminded early settlers from New Jersey of the New Jersey Palisades.

References

Unincorporated communities in DuPage County, Illinois
Unincorporated communities in Illinois